Boyd Morrison is an American thriller novelist, actor and former Jeopardy! champion. He has co-authored several books with The New York Times fiction best-seller Clive Cussler.

Education
Boyd Morrison has earned a bachelor's degree in mechanical engineering from Rice University and a PhD from Virginia Tech in industrial engineering.

Career
After his graduation from Rice University, Morrison joined Lockheed working on the Space Station Freedom project at Lyndon B. Johnson Space Center. He left NASA to get his PhD in industrial engineering from Virginia Tech. Morrison moved to Seattle and went to work for Microsoft in the Xbox games group. Among his credits are PC and Xbox games, including Project Gotham, Racing 2, Flight Simulator 2004, and Forza Motorsport.  Morrison left Microsoft in 2005 to write full-time.

Morrison's first book The Noah's Ark Quest (The Ark) was self published and later published by Simon and Schuster. The Ark (The Noah's Ark Quest) has been translated into 22 languages, was selected for IndieBound's Indie Next list in May 2010, and became a top 15 bestseller in the UK.

In 2022, The New York Times lauded his novel, The Lawless Land, as having "a satisfyingly bustling plot."

Bibliography

Tales of the Lawless Land
Boyd Morrison co-authors this series with sister Beth Morrison, an expert in medieval manuscripts at the J. Paul Getty Museum

The Oregon Files (Juan Cabrillo Series)
Morrison co-authors part of The Oregon Files series with Clive Cussler.

Tyler Locke Adventures

Stand Alone Novels

References

External links

Modern Signed Books Interview with Boyd Morrison about Typhoon Fury and writing with Clive Cussler

1967 births
Living people
American thriller writers
Jeopardy! contestants
Lockheed people
Microsoft people
NASA people
Rice University alumni
Virginia Tech alumni